The Belgian Association for Documentation (abbreviated ABD-BVD.) is a professional body for librarians, information specialists and knowledge managers in Belgium.

Created in 1947, the ABD-BVD's aims and activities converge to help those professionals in this permanent step towards the reinforcement of both their competence and the quality of their work.

It focuses its activities on: 
promoting information science related professions
new techniques and methods in information management
creating competence networks and allowing experience exchange
training its members
defending its members' interests at a European level

The Belgian Association for Documentation organizes an annual conference, the so-called "Inforum", to present important and actual topics in the field of information and documentation.
Since 1947, it also publishes the quarterly review Cahiers de la Documentation/Bladen voor Documentatie, with articles in French, Dutch and English.
The association includes today more than 500 professionals from the private and public sectors

Further reading
 Schweizer, Marko, World Guide to Library, Archive, and Information Science Associations: Second, completely revised and expanded Edition (Berlin: Walter de Gruyter ed., 2011), p. 101-102.
 Vanderpijpen, Willy, Belgium, in ALA World Encyclopedia of Library and Information Services. 2nd ed. (Chicago: American Library Association, 1986), pp. 103–105.

References

External links 

Library-related professional associations
Organisations based in Belgium
Organizations established in 1947